Grantville is an extinct town in Greene County, in the U.S. state of Georgia.

History
The community was named after Daniel Grant, a pioneer citizen.

References

Geography of Greene County, Georgia
Ghost towns in Georgia (U.S. state)